Lyonetia praefulva is a moth in the family Lyonetiidae.

Distribution
It is known from the Sri Lanka and Khassis, India.

This species has a wingspan of 8–11 mm. The forewings are shining white with a ferruginous-brown apical blotch.

References

Lyonetiidae
Moths described in 1911